Stanley Perzanowski (born August 25, 1950) is a former Major League Baseball pitcher, born in East Chicago, Indiana. He was drafted by the Chicago White Sox in the 16th round of the 1968 amateur draft. He threw right-handed during his baseball career.

Major League Baseball career
Perzanowski made his major league debut for the White Sox at age 20. That year, he went on to record an era of 12.00 in 6.0 innings. After spending 1972 and 1973 in the minors, he re-emerged with the White Sox, recording a 19.29 ERA in 2.1 innings. Perzanowski was traded from the White Sox to the Texas Rangers for Steve Dunning on February 25, 1975. In 1975, he had his breakout year, recording a team-best 3.00 ERA in 66.0 innings. In 1976, Perzanowski recorded a 10.03 ERA in 11.2 innings. He was dealt along with cash from the Rangers to the Cleveland Indians for Fritz Peterson on May 29, 1976. On March 28, 1977, Perzanowski was traded to the California Angels to complete an earlier trade. On August 16, 1977, he was released for the first time in his career. He was later picked up by the Minnesota Twins. In 1978 he finally got back to the Majors, recording an ERA of 5.24 in 56.2 innings. On February 13, 1979, Perzanowski was released by the Twins organization. Perzanowski decided it was time to retire, ending his Major League career.

At the time of his retirement Perzanowski had a 5–11 record, a 5.11 ERA, 60 walks, and 70 strikeouts. He was 0 for 2 batting, with a lifetime batting average of .000. His lifetime fielding percentage was .935.

References

External links

Pura Pelota

1950 births
Living people
Águilas del Zulia players
Appleton Foxes players
Asheville Tourists players
Baseball players from Indiana
Chicago White Sox players
Duluth-Superior Dukes players
Gulf Coast White Sox players
Iowa Oaks players
Major League Baseball pitchers
Minnesota Twins players
Sportspeople from East Chicago, Indiana
Petroleros de Zulia players
Salt Lake City Gulls players
Spokane Indians players
Texas Rangers players
Tigres de Aragua players
American expatriate baseball players in Venezuela
Toledo Mud Hens players
Tucson Toros players